Achilles is the name of a Greek mythological hero of the Trojan War.

Achilles or Achilleus may also refer to:

Science and medicine
 Achilles tendon, the posterior tendon of the leg
 588 Achilles, the first Trojan asteroid to be discovered

Fiction
 Achilleis (trilogy), a trilogy of plays by Aeschylus
 Achilles (Marvel Comics), a member of the fictional group the Pantheon in the Marvel universe
 Olympian (comics), whose second DC Comics incarnation is that of the Greek hero Achilles
 Achilles de Flandres, a villain in Orson Scott Card's Ender's Game novel series
 Achilles, Phoebus' horse in the animated film The Hunchback of Notre Dame

Music 
 Achilles (opera), a 1733 ballad opera by John Gay
 Achilleus a 1886 secular oratorio by Max Bruch
 Achilles (band), an American hardcore band

Places 
 Achilles, Kansas, US, a ghost town
 Achilles, Virginia, US, an unincorporated community
 Achilles Point, a headland in Auckland, New Zealand
 588 Achilles, the first Trojan asteroid to be discovered

People 
 Saints Nereus and Achilleus, 2nd century Christian saints and martyrs
 Achilles Tatius of Alexandria, 2nd century Greek writer
 Felix, Fortunatus, and Achilleus (died 212), Christian saints and martyrs
 Achilles or Achillius of Larissa (died 330), Christian saint
 Achilleus (Roman usurper), the ruler of Egypt for a very short time in the late 3rd century AD
 Achilles (judge royal) (died after 1201), Hungarian noble
 Achilles Alferaki (1846–1919), Russian-Greek composer and mayor
 Achilleus Kewanuka (1869–1886), Ugandan Christian saint and martyr
 Frederick Achilles, Duke of Württemberg-Neuenstadt (1591–1631) 
 Kullervo Achilles Manner (1880–1939), Finnish politician and journalist
 Theodore Achilles (1905–1986), American diplomat

Transport 
 Achilles (automobile), a British automobile maker, 1903–1908
 Achilles (1906–1912 motorcycle), a Czechoslovakian motorcycle manufacturer
 Achilles (1953–1957 motorcycle), a West German scooter and moped manufacturer
 Achilles (1873–1892), one of the ten South Devon Railway Buffalo class steam locomotives
 Achilles, one of the GWR 3031 Class locomotives that were built for and run on Great Western Railway between 1891 and 1915
 was one of the first steamships that were fuel efficient enough to trade between the UK and China.

Military 
 HMS Achilles, seven Royal Navy ships
 HMNZS Achilles, New Zealand Navy cruiser, 1932–1948
 USS Achilles, two US Navy ships
 17pdr SP M10C Achilles and 3in SP M10 Achilles, British variants of the M10, a World War II tank destroyer

Sport 
 Achilles '29, a Dutch football club based in Groesbeek
 Achilles F.C., an English football club based in Ipswich
 Achilles International, an international non-profit organization which provides support to athletes with disabilities

See also 
 Acanthurus achilles, commonly known as Achilles tang or Achilles surgeonfish, a species of tropical marine fish
 Achille (disambiguation)
 Achillea, the yarrows, a genus of flowering plants in the family Asteraceae
 Achilles' heel, a weakness or vulnerability
 Achilles number, a powerful number which is not a perfect power
 Achilleos, a surname
 Archicebus achilles, an extinct species of primate
 Borgå Akilles, a Finnish sports club based in Provoo
 Morpho achilles, the Achilles morpho, blue-banded morpho, or banded blue morpho, a species of Neotropical butterfly
 Phyllonorycter achilleus, a species of moth from the family Gracillariidae
 Z Achilles, a fictional weapon from the anime Beyblade Burst Turbo